Pelodera is a genus of nematodes belonging to the family Rhabditidae.

The species of this genus are found in Europe and Africa.

Species:

Pelodera aligarhensis 
Pelodera chitwoodi 
Pelodera conica
Pelodera kolbi
Pelodera litoralis 
Pelodera operosa 
Pelodera par 
Pelodera punctata 
Pelodera scrofulata 
Pelodera serrata 
Pelodera strongyloides 
Pelodera teres 
Pelodera voelki

References

Nematodes